is an underground metro station located in Mizuho-ku, Nagoya, Aichi Prefecture, Japan operated by the Nagoya Municipal Subway's Sakura-dōri Line. It is located 11.1 kilometers from the terminus of the Sakura-dōri Line at Nakamura Kuyakusho Station.

History
Mizuho Undōjō Nishi Station was opened on 30 March 1994.

Lines

 (Station number: S13)

Layout
Mizuho Undōjō Nishi Station has one underground island platform with platform screen doors.

Platforms

External links
 Mizuho Undōjō Nishi Station official web site

References

Railway stations in Japan opened in 1994
Railway stations in Aichi Prefecture